Qiyaslı (also, Arabkyyasly) is a village and municipality in the Agsu Rayon of Azerbaijan.  It has a population of 504.

References 

Populated places in Agsu District